Room: The Mystery  is a 2014 Indian thriller film directed by Faisal Khan and produced by Anil Kabra and Dinesh Deora under the Pen N Camera International and An India E-Commerce Ltd. banners starring Atif Jamil. The film was released on 12 December 2014.

Plot
 
Room - The Mystery is a story about Rishi and his friends who meet with an accident grievously injuring a woman and a child, while driving under the influence of alcohol. The woman then returns as a ghost to take revenge from all those who were responsible for her and her children's death.

Cast
Eshu Gambhir
Ibra Khan
Roselyn Dsouza
Atif Jamil(from IIT)
Himir Gandhi
Rohit Juneja
Shashwita Sharma
Saajan Ali Khokhar

References

External links
 
 

2014 films
2010s Hindi-language films
Indian thriller films
Films shot in Mumbai
2014 thriller films
Hindi-language thriller films